Trust an Amateur is the eighth album by Canadian music artist Marker Starling (Chris A. Cummings), released in January 2019. It is a collection of original material, with one cover version of "Fly Away", which was a song Cummings co-wrote for the musical "Spirits" with three others, including actor/comedian/musician Dennis Frey. The songs sprang from a period of collective grief and joy, as Cummings dealt with the death of Frey, and experienced the birth and first years of his first child.

"Fly Away" has sublime hooks, with the keyboard holding the song down and the lilt of Cummings' high notes reeling you in. - Kaitlin Ruether, Exclaim!

Track listing

Side 1
 Silver Morn
 Three Cheers
 Stoney Flame
 Fly Away (from the musical "Spirits")
 Ancestor
 Trust An Amateur

Side 2
 Mistaken I.D.
 Crosstown Bulletin
 Hold No Desire
 Leavetaking
 Mass Market Paperback
 Lost Rooms

Personnel
Mixed & Recorded by Guy Sternberg at LowSwing Studio, Berlin
Mastered by Sergey Luginin in Moscow
Artwork & Design by Sharmila Banerjee
Writing & arrangement, vocals, Hammond M-100, Wurlitzer, and percussion by Chris A. Cummings
Photography by Colin Medley
"Fly Away" written by Sam Allison, Chris A. Cummings, Dennis Frey & Peter Reitzel

References

External links
Now Toronto review
AllMusic review
Exclaim! review
"Fly Away" official music video

2019 albums